Alouette is an American brand of French-style cheeses produced by the French company Savencia Fromage & Dairy.

Information
The Alouette Cheese products are: Soft Spreadable Cheese, Crème de Brie, Baby Brie, Crème Fraiche, Élégante, and Crumbled Cheese. Sold throughout the US, its most popular variety is the Crème de Brie, which is spreadable Brie Cheese without the rind. The Alouette story begins in the early '70s when French cheese maker Jean-Noel Bongrain decided to bring his passion and skill for French specialty cheese to the States.

Advertisements
Two versions of a radio ad for Alouette cheese were run in 2003, using the song Alouette. They were only heard on WNEW-FM in New York. Alouette cheese once announced the launch of "Eat Artfully," the brand's summer media campaign. The campaign comprises a series of humorous "how-to" recipes intended to poke fun at trendy recipe videos that are easy to watch, but impossible to make. Launching June 29, the national integrated campaign will run through August across digital and social channels including Facebook, Instagram, YouTube and be supported by PR.

Events
On October 15, 2012, Alouette cheese was used for the Master Holiday Chef Challenge. Consumers were able to vote for their favorite chefs and recipes online. On February 16, 2012, Alouette started to produce new kinds of spreadable cheddars, Sharp Cheddar Cheese and Bacon Cheddar Cheese - which are Kosher certified and gluten-free.

See also

 List of spreads
 Cheese
 List of French cheeses

References

External links
http://www.alouettecheese.com/

American cheeses